Anacithara tumida is a species of sea snail, a marine gastropod mollusk in the family Horaiclavidae.

Description
The length of the shell attains 5.3 mm, its diameter 2 mm.

(Original description) The ovate shell is thin. Its colour is uniform white, or white with narrow ochraceous spiral lines. It contains six inflated whorls, including the protoconch, which is smooth, subdiscoidal, tilted to one side, and projecting over the next whorl. The ribs are broad and rounded, well spaced, discontinuous from one whorl to another, nine on the penultimate whorl, gradually vanishing towards the base. Both ribs and interstices overrun by fine dense spiral threads. The aperture is wide. The lip is simple.

Distribution
This marine species is endemic to Australia and occurs off Queensland.

References

External links
  Tucker, J.K. 2004 Catalog of recent and fossil turrids (Mollusca: Gastropoda). Zootaxa 682:1–1295.

tumida
Gastropods of Australia
Gastropods described in 1922